Air Squadrons (Air Regiments) of the Imperial Japanese Army Air Service were units of Air Groups. Typically 4-8 Air Squadrons (Sentai) made up an Air Group for the training or large-scale military operations.

Background
Each Air Combat Group was a single-purpose unit consisting typically of three Squadrons, divided into three  of three aircraft each. Together with reserve aircraft and the headquarters flight, an Air Combat Group typically had 45 aircraft (fighter) or up to 30 aircraft (bomber or reconnaissance). In 1942, the Air Corps were renamed , to mirror the terminology for infantry divisions, but the structure remained the same.

List of Air Squadrons (Hiko Sentai)

to be added to list
No. 23 Hikō Sentai IJAAF
No. 24 Hikō Sentai IJAAF
No. 25 Hikō Sentai IJAAF was No. 10 Dokuritsu Hikō Chutai IJAAF
No. 26 Hikō Sentai IJAAF
No. 27 Hikō Sentai IJAAF
No. 28 Hikō Sentai IJAAF
No. 29 Hikō Sentai IJAAF
No. 30 Hikō Sentai IJAAF
No. 31 Hikō Sentai IJAAF
No. 32 Hikō Sentai IJAAF
No. 33 Hikō Sentai IJAAF
No. 34 Hikō Sentai IJAAF
No. 35 Hikō Sentai IJAAF
No. 36 Hikō Sentai IJAAF - no source
No. 37 Hikō Sentai IJAAF - no source
No. 38 Hikō Sentai IJAAF
No. 39 Hikō Sentai IJAAF
No. 40 Hikō Sentai IJAAF - no source
No. 41 Hikō Sentai IJAAF - no source
No. 42 Hikō Sentai IJAAF - no source
No. 43 Hikō Sentai IJAAF - no source
No. 44 Hikō Sentai IJAAF
No. 45 Hikō Sentai IJAAF
No. 46 Hikō Sentai IJAAF
No. 47 Hikō Sentai IJAAF was No. 47 Dokuritsu Hikō Chutai IJAAF
No. 48 Hikō Sentai IJAAF
No. 49 Hikō Sentai IJAAF - no source
No. 50 Hikō Sentai IJAAF
No. 51 Hikō Sentai IJAAF
No. 52 Hikō Sentai IJAAF
No. 53 Hikō Sentai IJAAF
No. 54 Hikō Sentai IJAAF
No. 55 Hikō Sentai IJAAF
No. 56 Hikō Sentai IJAAF
No. 57 Hikō Sentai IJAAF - no source
No. 58 Hikō Sentai IJAAF
No. 59 Hikō Sentai IJAAF
No. 60 Hikō Sentai IJAAF
No. 61 Hikō Sentai IJAAF
No. 62 Hikō Sentai IJAAF
No. 63 Hikō Sentai IJAAF
No. 64 Hikō Sentai IJAAF
No. 65 Hikō Sentai IJAAF
No. 68 Hikō Sentai IJAAF
No. 70 Hikō Sentai IJAAF
No. 71 Hikō Sentai IJAAF
No. 72 Hikō Sentai IJAAF
No. 73 Hikō Sentai IJAAF
No. 74 Hikō Sentai IJAAF
No. 75 Hikō Sentai IJAAF
No. 76 Hikō Sentai IJAAF - no source
No. 77 Hikō Sentai IJAAF was No. 8 Dokuritsu Hikō Daitai IJAAF
No. 78 Hikō Sentai IJAAF
No. 79 Hikō Sentai IJAAF - no source
No. 80 Hikō Sentai IJAAF - no source
No. 81 Hikō Sentai IJAAF
No. 82 Hikō Sentai IJAAF
No. 83 Hikō Sentai IJAAF 
No. 84 Hikō Sentai IJAAF - no source
No. 85 Hikō Sentai IJAAF
No. 87 Hikō Sentai IJAAF
No. 90 Hikō Sentai IJAAF
 No. 95 Hikō Sentai IJAAF
No. 98 Hikō Sentai IJAAF
No. 101 Hikō Sentai IJAAF
No. 102 Hikō Sentai IJAAF
No. 103 Hikō Sentai IJAAF
No. 104 Hikō Sentai IJAAF
110th Hikō Sentai
No. 111 Hikō Sentai IJAAF
No. 112 Hikō Sentai IJAAF
No. 144 Hikō Sentai IJAAF
170th Bombardment Group (ex-60th Hikō Sentai and 110th Hikō Sentai)
No. 200 Hikō Sentai IJAAF
No. 204 Hikō Sentai IJAAF
No. 206 Hikō Sentai IJAAF
No. 244 Hikō Sentai IJAAF
No. 246 Hikō Sentai IJAAF was 82nd Dokuritsu Hiko Chutai IJAAF
No. 248 Hikō Sentai IJAAF
No. 2 Dokuritsu Hikō Daitai IJAAF
No. 9 Dokuritsu Hikō Chutai IJAAF
No. 25 Dokuritsu Hikō Chutai IJAAF
No. 71 Dokuritsu Hikō Chutai IJAAF
No. 84 Dokuritsu Hikō Chutai IJAAF
No. 102 Dokuritsu Hikō Chutai IJAAF
Rikugun Koukuu Shikan Gakkō
Tokorozawa Rikugun Koku Seibi Gakkō
Akeno Rikugun Hikō Gakkō
Kumagaya Rikugun Hikō Gakkō
Tachiarai Rikugun Hikō Gakkō
Hamamatsu Instructing Flying Division
Hitachi Army Flight Training School

See also
List of air divisions of the Imperial Japanese Army
Imperial Japanese Army Air Service

References

Air